ISO 14006, Environmental management systems - Guidelines for incorporating ecodesign, is an international standard that specifies guidelines to help organizations establish, document, implement, maintain, and continuously improve their ecodesign management as part of the environmental management system. The standard is intended to be used by organizations that have implemented an environmental management system in compliance with ISO 14001, but can help to integrate ecodesign into other management systems. The guideline is applicable to any organization regardless of its size or activity.

Edition and revision 
ISO 14006 was developed by ISO/TC207/SC1 Environmental management systems, and was published for the first time in July 2011. The second edition was published in January 2020.

ISO/TC 207 was established in the year 1993.

Main requirements of the standard 
The  'ISO 14006'  adopts a scheme in 5 chapters in the following subdivision:
 1 Scope
 2 Normative references
 3 Terms and definitions
 4 Role of top management in eco-design
 5 Guidelines for incorporating ecodesing into an EMS
 6 Ecodesign activities in product design and development

History

Notes

Related entries 
 ISO 14000
 Environmental management system (EMS)
 Ecodesign
 ISO standard
 List of International Organization for Standardization standards (ISO)
 European Committee for Standardization (CEN)

External links 
 ISO 14006-Environmental management systems - Guidelines for the integration of eco-design.
 ISO / TC 207-Environmental management systems.

14006
Technical specifications